In enzymology, a galactose-1-phosphate thymidylyltransferase is an enzyme that catalyzes the chemical reaction

dTTP + alpha-D-galactose 1-phosphate  diphosphate + dTDP-galactose

Thus, the two substrates of this enzyme are dTTP and alpha-D-galactose 1-phosphate, whereas its two products are diphosphate and dTDP-galactose.

This enzyme belongs to the family of transferases, specifically those transferring phosphorus-containing nucleotide groups (nucleotidyltransferases).  The systematic name of this enzyme class is dTTP:alpha-D-galactose-1-phosphate thymidylyltransferase. Other names in common use include dTDP galactose pyrophosphorylase, galactose 1-phosphate thymidylyl transferase, thymidine diphosphogalactose pyrophosphorylase, thymidine triphosphate:alpha-D-galactose 1-phosphate, and thymidylyltransferase.  This enzyme participates in nucleotide sugars metabolism.

References 

 

EC 2.7.7
Enzymes of unknown structure